Korea Newswire is the leading press release distribution service for publicity in South Korea.

Since its establishment in 2004, more than 33,000 organizations have used this online platform to boost their brand awareness and online visibility until the end of 2021.

Korea Newswire has the largest press release distribution network and database of Korean journalists. The distribution channels include a database of 34,000 journalists divided into 345 industry sectors and a newsroom distribution system for 4,300 media outlets.

Press releases placed on Korea Newswire are sent to web pages or news on the major search engines such as Google, Naver, Zum and Twitter. 

It operates a Korean website and English website. 

Korea Newswire offers 4 types of press release services. Those are Basic, Standard, Premium and Global services depending on how widely it distributes press releases. 

Customers can also choose additional services including press release writing, editing and translation.

In partnership with Business Wire since 2013, Korea Newswire distributes press releases to 100,000 media outlets in 162 countries. It is Global service.

Business Wire also distributes their press releases to Korean media via the Korea Newswire’s media network.  

After distributing the press releases to Korean media outlets, this company provides the result as a report. 

Korea Newswire monitors news from 5,000 media every day.

References

External links
 Newswire The official Korean site
 Korea Newswire The official English site
 Newswire Blog

News agencies based in South Korea
Mass media in Seoul